Caofeidian railway station is a railway station in Caofeidian District, Tangshan, Hebei, China.

Passenger services to Tangshan started on 28 December 2018. A service to Beijing was introduced on 21 August 2019.

References

Railway stations in Hebei
Railway stations in China opened in 2018